The Luxgen U5 is a 5-seater subcompact crossover SUV produced by the Taiwanese car company Luxgen.

In 2020, Luxgen confirmed that both S3 and U5 would cease production and would be relaunched as electric model.

Overview
The U5 crossover is based on the Luxgen S3 subcompact sedan and is positioned under the Luxgen U6 compact crossover.

The Luxgen U5 went on sale in Taiwan in September, 2017. There are five trims in Taiwan, which are Big Screen, APA, AR, Hi-Fi, and Vogue+. The base trim has 17-inch alloy wheels, cruise control, climate control, 12-inch display, ESC, TCS, HSA and dual airbags. APA comes in 6 airbags and front radar. AR adds power fold side mirrors, and AR Around View+. Hi-Fi adds front fog lamp and base speaker. Vogue+ comes in two-tone exterior and sunroof.

References

2017 establishments in Taiwan
Cars introduced in 2017
Crossover sport utility vehicles
Front-wheel-drive vehicles
U5
Mini sport utility vehicles